Uoyan is a rural locality (a settlement) in Severo-Baykalsky District, Republic of Buryatia, Russia. The population was 334 as of 2010. There are 11 streets.

Geography 
Uoyan is located 162 km east of Nizhneangarsk (the district's administrative centre) by road. Novy Uoyan is the nearest rural locality.

References 

Rural localities in Severo-Baykalsky District